William Digby was an Irish Anglican priest.

Digby was born in King's County (now Offaly) and educated at Trinity College, Dublin. He held livings at Killashee and Killukin. He was Archdeacon of Elphin from 1809  until 1823.

References 

Archdeacons of Elphin
Alumni of Trinity College Dublin
People from County Offaly
18th-century Irish Anglican priests
19th-century Irish Anglican priests